The Asia Pacific Masters Games is a regional multi-sport event which involves participants from the Asia-Pacific region. Governed by the International Masters Games Association (IMGA), the Asia Pacific Masters Games is open to participants of all abilities and most ages – the minimum age criterion ranges between 25 and 35 years depending on the sport. Participants compete for themselves, instead of their countries. There are no competition qualification requirements apart from the age requirement and membership in that sport's governing body. The Malaysian state of Penang hosted the event's first edition between 8 and 15 September 2018.

History 
A bidding process was held in Nice, France in 2015 to select the host cities for the first two editions of the Asia Pacific Masters Games. The Malaysian state of Penang was selected to host the inaugural edition in September 2018.

Sports

2018
The inaugural edition of the Asia-Pacific Masters Games in 2018 included 22 sports.

2023
In 2023, roller sports, sailing, triathlon, baseball, park golf, gateball, and judo will be added, and lion dance, netball, and pencak silat will be removed.

See also 
 Asia Masters Athletics Championships
 European Masters Games
 World Masters Games
 Americas Masters Games

External links
 Upcoming events

References 

Masters Games
Multi-sport events in Asia
Senior sports competitions
Recurring sporting events established in 2018